The following is an incomplete list of Pashtun or Afghan empires and dynasties. It includes states, princely states, empires and dynasties in the regions of Central, Western and South Asia which were founded by rulers of Pashtun ancestry.

In Western Asia

Hotak dynasty (1709–1738), established by Mir Wais Hotak from Kandahar, who declared independence from the Persian Safavids. Hotak was a tribal chief of the Ghilzai Pashtuns. The Hotaki dynasty ruled over much of southern Afghanistan and most of Iran (Persia) at its peak. The dynasty lasted until 1738 when it was overthrown by the Afsharids of Persia under Nader Shah.

Durrani Empire: 1747–1823 (Empire); 1793–1863 (Herat); 1839–1842 (Shah Shuja’s Kingdom), a Pashtun empire founded by the Pashtun military commander Ahmad Shah Durrani, with its origins in the Durrani dynasty of Afghanistan. Kandahar in modern Afghanistan served as the empire's first capital. Ahmad Shah belonged to the Durrani tribe (also known as the Abdalis). At its peak, the Durrani Empire encompassed all of Afghanistan, most of Pakistan and parts of northern India (including Kashmir), northeastern Iran and eastern Turkmenistan. In the second half of the 18th century, the Durrani Empire was the second-largest Muslim empire in the world after the Ottoman Empire. 
 Barakzai dynasty (1823–1978). From the early nineteenth century to early twentieth century, the Barakzais were the royal family of Afghanistan.

In South Asia

Khalji dynasty (1290–1320),  was a Turco-Afghan dynasty founded by Jalaluddin Khilji as the second dynasty to rule the Delhi Sultanate of India, it came to power through a revolution that marked the transfer of power from the monopoly of Turkic nobles to Afghans. Its rule is known for conquests into present day South India, and successfully fending off the repeated Mongol invasions of India.

 Lodi dynasty (1451–1526), founded by Bahlul Khan Lodi, who belonged from the Lodi tribe. The dynasty encompassed much of Pakistan and northern India, with its capital at Delhi. It was the last dynasty to rule the Delhi Sultanate.

Sur Empire (1540-1556), founded by Sher Shah Suri, a Pashtun military and political figure who belonged to the Sur tribe of Ghilzai confederation. The Sur dynasty ousted the Mughals in north India and controlled areas encompassing, Pakistan, northern India and up to Bengal, with Delhi as its capital. The Surs were supplanted again by the Mughals in 1557 after a sixteen-year rule.

 Karrani dynasty (1564–1576), founded by Taj Khan Karrani. He hailed from the Karlani tribe. He formerly served Sher Shah Suri and had moved to Bengal. The Karrani dynasty ruled over all of Bengal, as well as Orissa and parts of Bihar. It was the last dynasty of the Bengal Sultanate. The Karrani were defeated by the Mughals, losing all their territory to the latter by the seventeenth century.

 Malwa Sultanate (1392–1437), founded by Dilawar Khan, an Afghan or a Turco-Afghan  governor of the Delhi Sultanate. In 1437, the Ghurid dynasty of Dilawar Khan was overthrown by a Turk Mahmud Khan, but the Malwa Sultanate continued to exist until 1561/2.

Princely states

Several independent princely states founded by Pashtuns existed during the British Raj era. Most of the Pashtun region east of the Durand Line was annexed by the British in the twentieth century, and formed the North-West Frontier. The Pashtun tribal agencies along the Durand Line, further west from the North-West Frontier, formed a buffer zone between Afghanistan and the North-West Frontier of British India. Following the end of the Raj and the creation of Pakistan and India, the North-West Frontier and tribal agencies became part of Pakistan. The princely states were also given only two choices, the choice to formally accede to the Dominion of Pakistan or Dominion of India, depending on their geographical location. These princely states were eventually abolished and integrated into the federation (see Former administrative units of Pakistan and Political integration of India).

Rohilla Chieftaincies (1710–1857). Ali Mohammed Khan founded a strong Rohilla state in western U.P. After his death in 1748, Rohilkhand split up into several independent Rohilla Chieftaincies. Notable Chiefs were Hafiz Rahmat Khan, Najib ad-Dawlah, Faizullah Khan, and Dundy Khan. In 1772 the total Rohilla armed forces were estimated at 80,000 cavalry and infantry. Rohillas were the main allies of the Durranis in Third Panipat War in 1761.  Most of the Rohilla leaders were defeated in Anglo-Rohilla wars.  Only Rampur, under Faizullah Khan, survived as a princely state.
 Orakzai dynasty was a dynasty which directly descended from the Orakzai tribe. Various branches ruled these princely states:
 Bhopal State (1707–1949), a princely state existing from 1707 to 1949, although its origins date back to 1707 when the Bhopal State was established by Dost Mohammad Khan, a Pashtun soldier in the Mughal Army who belonged to the Mirazi Khel clan of the Orakzai tribe from Tirah (located in the present-day tribal areas of northwest Pakistan). The state came under the suzerainty of the Nizam of Hyderabad shortly after its foundation in 1723, and then came under the Marathas in 1737 after their victory in the Battle of Bhopal. It became a princely state in 1818, following the defeat of the Marathas in the Third Anglo-Maratha War. Islamnagar served as the first capital, followed by Bhopal (in present-day Madhya Pradesh). The city of Islamnagar and Bhopal was founded by Dost Mohammad Khan in 1716 and early 1720s. It was the second largest Muslim princely state in pre-independence India, after Hyderabad State. In 1949, the state acceded to the Dominion of India (see Pathans of Madhya Pradesh for more information).
 Kurwai State (1713–1948), founded by Muhammad Diler Khan, a Pashtun rising through merit in the Mughal Army. Muhammad Diler Khan belonged to the Firoz Khel clan of the Orakzai tribe,  Diler Khan's state consisted of the town of Kurwai and several surrounding villages in present-day Madhya Pradesh.  The town of Kurwai was founded by Mohammed Diler Khan in 1715
 Basoda State (1753–1947), established by Muhammad Ahsanullah Khan son of Muhammad Diler Khan founder of Kurwai State belonged to the Firoz Khel clan of the Orakzai tribe,  its headquarters were at Ganj Basoda in present-day Madhya Pradesh.
 Mohammadgarh State (1818–1947), established by Muhammad khan son of Muhammad Ahsanullah Khan founder of Basoda State belonged to the Firoz Khel clan of the Orakzai tribe, its headquarters were at Muhammadgarh in present-day Madhya Pradesh. The town of Muhammadgarh was founded by Muhammed Khan and named by his name.
 Babi dynasty (1654–1948), founded in 1654 by Muhammed Sherkhanji Babi.  He belonged to Babi or Babai (Pashtun tribe) tribe of Pashtuns. The Babi Dynasty ruled over parts of Gujarat. Babi's descendants (see Pathans of Gujarat for more information) controlled the following princely states:
 Junagadh State (1730–1948), 1st Nawab, Muhammad Sher khan Babi, a pathan belonging to the family of last deputy Governor of Gujarat province in Mughal Empire. Muhammad Sher khan Babi belonged to the Babi or Babai (Pashtun tribe) of Pashtuns, its headquarters were at Junagadh in present-day Gujarat.
 Radhanpur State (1753–1948), Jawan Mard Khan Babi II, 1st Nawab, a pathan belonging to the family of last deputy Governor of Gujarat province in Mughal Empire. Nawab Khan Jahan Babi belonged to the Babi or Babai (Pashtun tribe) of Pashtuns, its headquarters were at Radhanpur in present-day Gujarat.
 Balasinor State (1758–1948), 1st Nawab, Sardar Muhammed khan Babi, a pathan belonging to the family of last deputy Governor of Gujarat province in Mughal Empire. Sardar Muhammed khan Babi belonged to the Babi or Babai (Pashtun tribe) tribe of Pashtuns, its headquarters were at Balasinor in present-day Gujarat.
 Bantva Manavadar (1733–1947), 1st Nawab, Diler Khan Salabat Muhammed Khan Babi, a pathan belonging to the family of last deputy Governor of Gujarat province in Mughal Empire. Dilawer Khan Salabat Muhammed khan Babi belonged to the Babi or Babai (Pashtun tribe) of Pashtuns. Its headquarters were at Manavadar in present-day Gujarat.
 Sardargarh Bantva (1733–1948), 1st Nawab, Khan Shri Sherzamankhanji Babi, a pathan belonging to the family of last deputy Governor of Gujarat province in Mughal Empire. Khan Shri Sherzamankhanji Babi belonged to the Babi or Babai (Pashtun tribe)  tribe of Pashtuns, its headquarters were at Bantva in present-day Gujarat.
 Dir, small princely state comprising the present-day Upper Dir and Lower Dir districts of Khyber Pakhtunkhwa in Pakistan. The state was founded in the seventeenth century by an Akhun Khel clan of the Malizai sept of Yusufzai tribe, with Dir serving as the capital. Dir nawab acceded to Pakistan in 1948. In 1969, the state along with the royal house was abolished.
 Farrukhabad State
 Malerkotla State (1657–1948), The Malerkotla state was founded in 1454 A.D. by Sheikh Sadruddin-i-Jahan, a pious man of the Sherani tribe of the Darban Kalan and Frontier Region of Drazinda. The State of Malerkotla was established in 1657 by Bayazid Khan.  Bayazid Khan was granted the privilege to build a fort, which he named Malerkotla and eventually gave its name to the state. On 3 May 1809 Maler Kotla became a British protectorate and was made part of the Cis-Sutlej states until 1862.  Many local people attribute this peaceful strain to the presence of the shrine of 'Baba Haidar Sheikh', the Sufi saint, who founded the town of Malerkotla more than 500 years ago.
 Pataudi State (1804–1947), established in 1804 by Nawab Faiz Talab Khan of Barech tribe during the rule of the British East India Company and capital as Pataudi
 Dujana State (1806–1948), established in 1806 by Nawab Abdus Samad Khan of Yusufzai tribe during the rule of the British East India Company and situated in Jhajjar district
 Tonk State (1806–1949), The founder of the state was Muhammad Amir Khan an adventurer and military leader of pashtun descent and belonged to the salarzai subtribe of the Tarkani tribe and a Rohilla. In 1817, upon submitting to the British East India Company, he kept his territory of Tonk and received the title of Nawab. While retaining internal autonomy and remaining outside British India, the state consisted of six isolated districts. Four of these were under the Rajasthan province, namely, Tonk, Chhabra, Pirawa and Nimbahera. The other two, Aligarh formerly Rampura and Sironj were in Madhya pradesh province.
 Jaora State (1808–1948), founded by Abdul Ghafur Muhammad Khan, a Pashtun cavalry officer and a Rohilla serving Muhammad Amir Khan, the Pashtun founder of the princely state of Tonk. Abdul Ghafur Muhammad Khan also served the Holkar ruler, annexing Rajput territories in northern Malwa. For his services, he was designated the title of a nawab. His state existed in modern Madhya Pradesh, comprising the tehsils of Jaora, Barauda, Tal and Barkhera, along with the dependencies of Piploda and Panth-Piploda.
 Palanpur State (1370–1948), Palanpur state was founded in 1370 by Malek Khurram Khan and was ruled by the Jhalore dynasty, of the Lohani tribe a forebearer of the family is reputed to have wed the foster-sister of the Mughal emperor Akbar and received Palanpur and surrounding areas as dowry.
 Savanur State (1672–1948), Savanur State was founded in 1672 when Abdul Karim Khan, a Pathan of the Miyana or Miani tribe, in the service of the sultanat of Bijapur, was granted the jagir of Sarkar Bankapur near Bijapur in 1672. His successors ruled over extensive territories almost independently for over a century. However, Savanur was located between the increasing power of the Marathas and the equally powerful Nizam of Hyderabad, Hyder Ali and Tipu Sultan, ofKingdom of Mysore which gradually eroded away Savanur's territory. By the second half of the eighteenth century, more than half of Savanur had been ceded to the Marathas. By the end of the century, Tipu Sultan had annexed the remainder. The occupation by the Kingdom of Mysore (Mahisur) had begun on 29 Oct 1786 and lasted until 17 December 1791. The name Savanur is said to be the corruption of the Persian/Urdu word Shahnoor, which means 'king of light'.
 Swat (princely state)

Princely Taluqdars, Jagirdars, Nawabs

 Nanpara Taluqdari (1632–1947), the Nanpara principality was founded by a Rasul Khan, he was appointed keeper of the fort at Bahraich in 1632 by Emperor Shah Jahan in Bahraich District. He was also granted five villages as jagir, and these five villages formed the core of what was to become the Nanpara Taluqdari. His descendant, Karam Khan taking advantage of the collapse of Mughal authority in the early 18th century, extended his rule over pretty much the entire district. The Nanpara Taluqdari was one of the taluqdars (feudatory states) in British India. The title of "Raja" was conferred on the Nanpara House in 1763 by the Nawab Shuja-ud-Daula, the King of Oudh and has then recognized by British. With holding of 439 villages it was the largest Muslim taluqdars (landowners) in British India.
 Mamdot Nawabi (1800–1947), Qutubuddin Khan, a Kheshgi and Chief of Kasur 1794/1807, Nawab of Mamdot 1800/1831 in Ferozepur district in Indian Punjab; he conquered Mamdot from the Rai of Raikot in 1800, but lost control of Kasur in 1807.  Jalalabad, Firozpur was founded by Nawab of Mamdot as its capital. Nawab Sir Shahnawaz Khan Mamdot was the largest Muslim Nawab of the Punjab Chiefs.

See also
 Pashtun tribes
 military history of Afghanistan
 Military history of the North-West Frontier
 Pashtun colonization of northern Afghanistan
 Muslim conquests in the Indian subcontinent
 List of Muslim states and dynasties
 List of Sunni dynasties
 List of Iranian dynasties and countries

Notes

References

 
Islamic rule in the Indian subcontinent
Pashtun